Brachyomus is a Neotropical genus of broad-nosed weevils in the subfamily Entiminae, tribe Eustylini.

Taxonomy 
Brachyomus was described for the first time by Jean-Baptiste Henri Lacordaire in 1863 (p. 130).

Description 
Members of the genus Brachyomus are easily confused with members of the genus Compsus. Members of Brachyomus lack elytral shoulders and usually bear tubercles (four or more; there are only two in Compsus when they have them) on the broadest part of the elytra. They are usually covered by brown to whitish scales, forming some patterning; they can also bear metallic green or blue scales; some species have waxy secretions at the base of the elytral tubercles. There are thick scales rather uniform;y distributed all over the surface of the body, sometimes more densely so on the elytral tubercles. There is a key to identify most species in Faust (1892).

Distribution 
The genus Brachyomus is distributed in Colombia, Ecuador, French Guiana, Peru, Trinidad, Venezuela and Saint Vincent

List of species 
Brachyomus contains 7 described species:

 Brachyomus bicostatus Faust, 1892: 14: Venezuela.
 Brachyomus histrio Faust, 1892: 14: Venezuela.
 Brachyomus metallescens Pascoe, 1880: 427: Ecuador, Peru.
 Brachyomus octotuberculatus (Fabricius), 1787: 112: French Guiana, Trinidad, Venezuela.
 Brachyomus quadrinodosus (Boheman), 1842: 217  = Brachyomus sallei Faust, 1892: 15: Colombia, Venezuela.
 Brachyomus quadrituberculatus (Boheman), 1842: 216: Colombia, Venezuela.
 Brachyomus tuberculatus (Boheman), 1842: 218: Saint Vincent.

References 

Weevils